Theater Hagen is a theatre in Hagen in North Rhine-Westphalia, Germany.

Theatres in North Rhine-Westphalia
Buildings and structures in Hagen